Ronald Michael Diorio (born July 15, 1946), and attended Sacred Heart High School in Waterbury, Connecticut. He batted and threw right-handed.

Diorio was drafted by the Phillies in the 16th round (366th overall) of the 1969 Major League Baseball draft, out of the University of New Haven. other picks were hall of famers Bert Blyleven and Dave Winfield

Diorio logged a 0–0 record, with a 3.10 earned run average (ERA), in 25 games played, over the course of his two-year big league career.

References

External links

Ron Diorio at SABR (Baseball BioProject)

1946 births
Living people
Baseball players from Connecticut
Major League Baseball pitchers
Philadelphia Phillies players
Sportspeople from Waterbury, Connecticut
Florida Instructional League Phillies players
Memphis Blues players
Peninsula Phillies players
Pericos de Puebla players
Reading Phillies players
Syracuse Chiefs players
Tigres de Quintana Roo players
Toledo Mud Hens players
Walla Walla Bears players
West Haven Yankees players
New Haven Chargers baseball players
American expatriate baseball players in Mexico